Etoniah Creek State Forest is in the U.S. state of Florida. The  forest is located in North Central Florida, west of Palatka near Florahome.  This area is the only known site for Conradina etonia, an endangered plant.

Etoniah Creek forest has two tracts. The main tract runs from Coral Farms Road southwest of George's Lake toward the north side of Florida State Road 100 east of Florahome, and includes the creek of the namesake of the forest. The Manning Tract is northeast of the main tract along Putnam County Road 309D (Bardin Road), and is named for Manning Road, a local side street on the west side of that route. 

The Palatka-Lake Butler State Trail bisects the southern edge of the forest. The Florida National Scenic Trail also runs through parts of the forest.

See also
List of Florida state forests
List of Florida state parks

References

External links

 Etoniah Creek State Forest: Florida Forest Service - FDACS

Florida state forests
Protected areas of Putnam County, Florida